In mathematics, the Yoneda lemma is arguably the most important result in category theory.  It is an abstract result on functors of the type morphisms into a fixed object. It is a vast generalisation of Cayley's theorem from group theory (viewing a group as a miniature category with just one object and only isomorphisms). It allows the embedding of any locally small category into a category of functors (contravariant set-valued functors) defined on that category. It also clarifies how the embedded category, of representable functors and their natural transformations, relates to the other objects in the larger functor category. It is an important tool that underlies several modern developments in algebraic geometry and representation theory. It is named after Nobuo Yoneda.

Generalities 

Treating these new objects just like the old ones often unifies and simplifies the theory.

This approach is akin to (and in fact generalizes) the common method of studying a ring by investigating the modules over that ring.

Formal statement 

Yoneda's lemma concerns functors from a fixed category  to the category of sets, . If  is a locally small category (i.e. the hom-sets are actual sets and not proper classes), then each object  of  gives rise to a natural functor to  called a hom-functor. This functor is denoted:
.
That is,
 
 

Yoneda's lemma says that:

Contravariant version 

This version involves the contravariant hom-functor

which sends  to the hom-set .

Naming conventions 

Many texts and articles either use the opposite convention or completely unrelated symbols for these two functors. However, most modern algebraic geometry texts starting with Alexander Grothendieck's foundational EGA use the convention in this article.

The mnemonic "falling into something" can be helpful in remembering that  is the covariant hom-functor. When the letter  is falling (i.e. a subscript),  assigns to an object  the morphisms from  into .

Proof 
Since  is a natural transformation, we have the following commutative diagram:

This diagram shows that the natural transformation  is completely determined by  since for each morphism  one has

Moreover, any element  defines a natural transformation in this way. The proof in the contravariant case is completely analogous.

The Yoneda embedding 

In this case, the covariant version of Yoneda's lemma states that

That is, natural transformations between hom-functors are in one-to-one correspondence with morphisms (in the reverse direction) between the associated objects. Given a morphism  the associated natural transformation is denoted .

One can interpret  as a covariant functor:

Therefore, Yoneda embedding implies that the category  is isomorphic to the category .

The contravariant version of Yoneda's lemma states that

This is called the Yoneda embedding.

The Yoneda embedding is sometimes denoted by よ, the Hiragana kana Yo.

Representable functor 

The Yoneda embedding essentially states that for every (locally small) category, objects in that category can be represented by presheaves, in a full and faithful manner.  That is,

for a presheaf P.  Many common categories are, in fact, categories of pre-sheaves, and on closer inspection, prove to be categories of sheaves, and as such examples are commonly topological in nature, they can be seen to be topoi in general. The Yoneda lemma provides a point of leverage by which the topological structure of a category can be studied and understood.

In terms of (co)end calculus 

For any functors  and  the following formulas are all formulations of the Yoneda lemma.

Preadditive categories, rings and modules 

A preadditive category is a category where the morphism sets form abelian groups and the composition of morphisms is bilinear; examples are categories of abelian groups or modules. In a preadditive category, there is both a "multiplication" and an "addition" of morphisms, which is why preadditive categories are viewed as generalizations of rings. Rings are preadditive categories with one object.

The Yoneda lemma remains true for preadditive categories if we choose as our extension the category of additive contravariant functors from the original category into the category of abelian groups; these are functors which are compatible with the addition of morphisms and should be thought of as forming a module category over the original category. The Yoneda lemma then yields the natural procedure to enlarge a preadditive category so that the enlarged version remains preadditive — in fact, the enlarged version is an abelian category, a much more powerful condition.

Relationship to Cayley's theorem 
As stated above, the Yoneda lemma may be considered as a vast generalization of Cayley's theorem from group theory. To see this, let  be a category with a single object  such that every morphism is an isomorphism (i.e. a groupoid with one object). Then  forms a group under the operation of composition, and any group can be realized as a category in this way.

The Yoneda lemma with  states that
,

History 

Yoshiki Kinoshita stated in 1996 that the term "Yoneda lemma" was coined by Saunders Mac Lane following an interview he had with Yoneda in the Gare du Nord station.

See also 
 Representation theorem

Notes

References 

 .

External links 
 Mizar system proof: 

Representable functors
Lemmas in category theory
Articles containing proofs